Conus vexillum, common name the vexillum cone or the flag cone, is a species of sea snail, a marine gastropod mollusk in the family Conidae, the cone snails and their allies.

These snails are predatory and venomous. They are capable of "stinging" humans, therefore alive ones should be handled carefully or not at all.

Description
The shell is large and rather thin. The spire is striate. The color of the shell is yellowish or chestnut, with an irregular white central band, sometimes obsolete, and occasionally another interrupted band at the shoulder. The spire is variegated with white and chestnut broad flames, the latter often overlaying also the lighter chestnut of the body whorl.

Distribution
The species is found across the entire Indo-Pacific from Natal to Hawaii and French Polynesia and Japan to Australia (Northern Territory, Queensland, Western Australia). The subspecies Conus vexillium sumatrensis is restricted to the northwest Indian Ocean.

Habitat and Ecology
There have been sightings of this species in shallow water, lagoon pinnacles, sand, sand with gravel, among weed or rocks and under dead coral. It is said to be able to withstand rough waters. The species feeds on eunicid polychaetes.

References

 Röding, P.F. 1798. Museum Boltenianum sive Catalogus cimeliorum e tribus regnis naturae quae olim collegerat Joa. Hamburg : Trappii 199 pp. 
 Reeve, L.A. 1843. Monograph of the genus Conus. pls 1–39 in Reeve, L.A. (ed.). Conchologica Iconica. London : L. Reeve & Co. Vol. 1.
 Kiener L.C. 1844–1850. Spécies général et iconographie des coquilles vivantes. Vol. 2. Famille des Enroulées. Genre Cone (Conus, Lam.), pp. 1–379
 Bernardi, A. C. 1858. Descriptions d'espèces nouvelles. Journal de Conchyliologie 7: 182–184
 Hedley, C. 1899. The Mollusca of Funafuti. Part 1. Gastropoda. Memoirs of the Australian Museum 3(7): 395–488, 49 text figs
 Demond, J. 1957. Micronesian reef associated gastropods. Pacific Science 11(3): 275–341, fig. 2, pl. 1 
 Gillett, K. & McNeill, F. 1959. The Great Barrier Reef and Adjacent Isles: a comprehensive survey for visitor, naturalist and photographer. Sydney : Coral Press 209 pp.
 Maes, V.O. 1967. The littoral marine mollusks of Cocos-Keeling Islands (Indian Ocean). Proceedings of the Academy of Natural Sciences, Philadelphia 119: 93–217
 Wilson, B.R. & Gillett, K. 1971. Australian Shells: illustrating and describing 600 species of marine gastropods found in Australian waters. Sydney : Reed Books 168 pp.
 Salvat, B. & Rives, C. 1975. Coquillages de Polynésie. Tahiti : Papéete Les editions du pacifique, pp. 1–391.
 Röckel, D., Korn, W. & Kohn, A.J. 1995. Manual of the Living Conidae. Volume 1: Indo-Pacific Region. Wiesbaden : Hemmen 517 pp.
 Filmer R.M. (2001). A Catalogue of Nomenclature and Taxonomy in the Living Conidae 1758 – 1998. Backhuys Publishers, Leiden. 388pp.
 Tucker J.K. (2009). Recent cone species database. September 4, 2009 Edition.
 Tucker J.K. & Tenorio M.J. (2009) Systematic classification of Recent and fossil conoidean gastropods. Hackenheim: Conchbooks. 296 pp.
 Severns M. (2011) Shells of the Hawaiian Islands – The Sea Shells. Conchbooks, Hackenheim. 564 pp.

Gallery

External links
 
 The Conus Biodiversity website
 Cone Shells – Knights of the Sea
 Holotype in MNHN, Paris

vexillum
Gastropods described in 1791
Taxa named by Johann Friedrich Gmelin